Pyropteron muscaeforme, the thrift clearwing, is a moth of the family Sesiidae. It is known from most of Europe. A small member of its genus, the wingspan is 15–18 mm. It is further distinguished by narrow clear (transparent) spaces on the blackish, or bronzy, forewings. There are three whitish bands on the body, and traces of a whitish line along the middle of the back.

Adults can be found on the flowers of the host plant, as well as on thyme (Thymus vulgaris). It overwinters as a larva. The larvae feed on in the roots and crown of thrift (Armeria maritima).

Ecology
It is found on exposed rocky areas where its larval food plant occurs.

Subspecies
 Pyropteron muscaeforme muscaeforme
 Pyropteron muscaeforme occidentale (de Joannis, 1908)
 Pyropteron muscaeforme lusohispanicum Lastuvka & Lastuvka, 2007

References

External links
 UKMoths
 
 

Sesiidae
Moths described in 1783
Moths of Europe
Moths of Asia
Taxa named by Eugenius Johann Christoph Esper